Julia Bryan-Wilson is the Doris and Clarence Malo Professor of Modern and Contemporary Art at the University of California, Berkeley. She received a Guggenheim Fellowship in 2019.

Career 
Bryan-Wilson received her BA from Swarthmore College in 1995 and her PhD from the University of California, Berkeley in 2004. In addition to teaching at the University of California, Berkeley, Bryan-Wilson has also taught at the Rhode Island School of Design, California College of the Arts, the University of California, Irvine, and at the Courtauld Institute of Art, London. She also served as one of the Robert Sterling Clark Professors in the Graduate Art History department at Williams College from 2018 to 2019.

Bryan-Wilson studies feminist and queer theory, modern and contemporary art, craft histories, and questions of artistic labor, as well as photography, video, collaborative practices, and visual culture of the Atomic Age.

Her book, Art Workers: Radical Practice in the Vietnam War Era, was published by the University of California Press in 2009. Her second book, Fray: Art and Textile Politics, was published by the University of Chicago Press in 2017 and was awarded the 2018 Robert Motherwell Book Award by the Dedalus Foundation. Fray was also awarded the Book Prize from The Association for the Study of the Arts of the Present (or ASAP). Bryan-Wilson's article, "Invisible Products," published in the Summer 2012 issue of Art Journal, received the 2013 Art Journal Award for Outstanding Article of the Year from the College Art Association.

She is the editor of Robert Morris (October Files), published by the Massachusetts Institute of Technology in 2013. With Glenn Adamson, Byran-Wilson is also the co-author of Art in the Making: Artists and their Materials from the Studio to Crowdsourcing (1st Edition), published by Thames & Hudson in June 2016.

Bryan-Wilson is co-curator of Cecilia Vicuña: About to Happen at the Contemporary Arts Center in New Orleans in 2017. The show traveled to the Institute for Contemporary Art at the University of Pennsylvania in February 2019.

Publications

References

American women academics
Living people
American art historians
Women art historians
LGBT studies academics
California College of the Arts faculty
Rhode Island School of Design faculty
Swarthmore College people
University of California, Berkeley alumni
University of California, Berkeley College of Letters and Science faculty
University of California, Irvine faculty
Year of birth missing (living people)
Historians from California
21st-century American women